Karnataka a state in southern India was formed on November 1, 1956  name of Mysore state on November 1,1973 renamed as Karnataka The state is divided into 4 divisions.

 Bengaluru
 Belagavi
 Kalaburagi
 Mysuru

References and Additional Resources
Karnataka Website
Karnataka Information Profile